Archangelos (before 1925: Όσσιανη - Ossiani) is a village and part of the Exaplatanos municipal unit in the Pella regional unit of Macedonia, Greece, near Aridaia. The village is known for its monastery of Saint Michael, in which many monks occupy themselves with the painting of icons. The inhabitants of Archangelos mainly make their living out of the cultivation of cherries. The town is not widely known among tourists, though there are a few B&B's, shops and bars.

Archangelos had 709 inhabitants in 1981. In fieldwork done by Riki Van Boeschoten in late 1993, Archangelos was populated by Vlachs, more precisely Meglen Vlachs or Megleno-Romanians. The Megleno-Romanian language was used by people of all ages, both in public and private settings, and as the main language for interpersonal relationships. Some elderly villagers had little knowledge of Greek.

References

 www.archanggelos.gr
 Example of Megleno-Romanian speech from the village of Archangelos

Populated places in Pella (regional unit)
Megleno-Romanian settlements